ESL Pro League Season 2 (officially known as ESL ESEA Pro League Season 2; shortened as EPL Season 2) was an Electronic Sports League (ESL) Counter-Strike: Global Offensive tournament. It was the second season of the ESL Pro League. The Finals took place in Burbank, California, United States from December 10 to December 13, 2015. The regular season for Europe began on September 9, 2015, with Ninjas in Pyjamas beating Team EnVyUs and ended with Team EnVyUs defeating mousesports. North America's season began on the same date and kicked off with compLexity Gaming defeating Enemy and concluded with Team Liquid defeating Enemy. The season ended with Fnatic defeating Natus Vincere in a close best of five finals, 3–2. Teams from two continents, North America and Europe, competed in twelve team leagues and play against each other twice to determine the top four teams from each continent would play in the Finals.

Format
Each continent featured the top nine teams from last season's ESL Pro League Season 1, the winning team from ESEA Season 19: Premier Division for North America and the winning team from ESEA Season 21: Premier Division for Europe, and two teams from the ESL Pro League Season 1 Relegation. North America had one more spot remaining after roster of  disbanded, so ESL invited one more team to complete the twelve team league. Teams within each continent will play each other twice to determine the top four teams to the Finals in Burbank. The regular season spanned to eleven weeks of play and all these matches were played online.

The top four teams after the conclusion of the regular season moved on to Burbank to play in the Finals; in addition, those teams were invited to next season's ESL Pro League. Teams that placed fifth to ninth place did not make the Finals, but were invited to next season's ESL Pro League. The teams in ninth and tenth place were required to play in Season 2's Relegation match, in which two teams from each continent play to see which team moves on to next season's ESL Pro League. The teams in twelfth place would have no chance to redeem themselves and were automatically demoted to the premier division.

The Finals consisted of eight teams, four from Europe and four from North America. These teams will be separated into two groups – the first and third seeds from North America and the second and fourth seeds from Europe will be in one group and the other teams in the other group. The group stage will consist of the highest seed going against the lowest seed and the middle two seeds against each other, both games in a best of one format. The winners will play in a best of one to determine one team in the Playoffs; the losers will play in a best of three to determine which team gets eliminated from the tournament. The remaining two teams will play in a best of three to determine which team will be the second team in the group to move on to the Playoffs. In the Playoffs, the semifinals will be a best of three and the finals will be a best of five. The winner of the finals will win the tournament and the top prize. All games in the Finals will be played offline.

Teams

North America

Broadcast Talent
Commentators
 Cory "megaman" Gilbert
 John "BLU" Mullen
 Jason "moses" O'Toole

Final standings

1Coastless disbands before the season starts, forcing the team to forfeit all games.

Europe

Broadcast Talent
Commentators
 Anders Blume
 Mitch "Uber" Leslie
 Auguste "Semmler" Massonnat
 Alex "Machine" Richardson
 Lauren "Pansy" Scott
 Leigh "Deman" Smith

Finals
The finalized teams are shown below. Each team's world ranking for December 8, 2015 is also shown.

Broadcast Talent
Host
 Alex "Machine" Richardson
Commentators
 Anders Blume
 Sean "sgares" Gares
 Corey "Megaman" Gilbert
 Robin "Fifflaren" Johansson
 Auguste "Semmler" Massonnat
 John "BLU" Mullen
 Jason "moses" O'Toole
 Lauren "Pansy" Scott
 Matthew "Sadokist" Trivett
Observers
 Heather "sapphiRe" Garrozo

Group stage

Group A

Group B

Playoffs

Bracket

Semifinals

Finals

Finals Standings

Between the end of the online season and the start of the finals, an unexpected number of changes took place.

The players of Team SoloMid opted out of their contracts, leaving the players without a team. Before the players started their own organization, which would be called Astralis, the team played under the name "?", which is pronounced "Question Mark."

Team EnVyUs pick up a new coach, Jordan "Next" Savelli.

Jonathan "EliGE" Jablonowski had final exams for his high school on the first day of finals, so Team Liquid brought in former Counter-Strike: Source professional turned streamer Mohamad "m0E" Assad as a replacement in Liquid's match against EnVyUs.

Luminosity Gaming replaced Ricardo "boltz" Prass, Lucas "steel" Lopes, and Renato "nak" Nakano and brought up Lincoln "fnx" Lau, Epitácio "TACO" de Melo, and Wilton "zews" Prado from Games Academy, an organization FalleN is the owner of.

References

2015 in esports
ESL Pro League